The Renault Kerax is a medium- and heavy-duty truck manufactured by Renault Trucks, aimed at the construction industry, and is available as a rigid body or tractor configuration. It was launched in 1997, and underwent a full upgrade in 2006. Production of the Kerax ended in 2013, when it was replaced by the C and K range  which are powered by Euro VI engines. Military versions, however, are still available.

Specifications
Since 2009 the Kerax is powered by the DXi11 11.1 L 6-cylinder diesel engine which is Euro V compliant, and available in three tuning configurations: /, / and /. There is a choice between a 16-speed manual gearbox, or an automated 12-speed gearbox.

Prior to 2009, the Kerax was powered by Euro III DXi11 10.8 L engines producing /, / and /.

Suspension varies depending on model; parabolic on the 26t version, and semi-elliptical for the 32t version.

The Kerax is manufactured in the Russian city of Kaluga at the Volvo Trucks factory which opened in 2009.

Mack Defense Kerax 8x8
Mack Trucks sells a rebadged Kerax as a military logistics and tactical truck. The Canadian Army ordered over 1,500 Kerax trucks from 2017 to 2018. These vehicles replaced the second half of the Medium Support Vehicle System contract originally awarded to Navistar International for the  Navistar 7400.

Dakar Rally

The Kerax is often used in the Dakar Rally as a support vehicle.

References

External links

Renault Kerax brochure

Kerax
Cab over vehicles
Vehicles introduced in 1997